David McGuffin is a broadcast journalist, podcast host and producer who reports on Canada for National Public Radio. Prior his return home to Ottawa, he was a Supervising Editor with National Public Radio in Washington, DC on its flagship news and current affairs program, Morning Edition.   In 2010 he helped launch Voice of America's South Sudan radio service, as its Managing Editor.   From 2004 until 2010, he was the Africa Correspondent for the Canadian Broadcasting Corporation, reporting for its television, radio and digital news services. From his base in Nairobi, Kenya, he re-asserted CBC's presence on the continent, regularly reporting from conflict zones in Darfur, Congo, Somalia and Afghanistan.  He also covered a wide range of social, economic, and cultural issues affecting Africa, travelling from Timbuktu to Mogadishu, Khartoum to Cape Town. In his work, he covered Nelson Mandela's final international tour as South African President, interviewed Nobel Peace Prize Winner Desmond Tutu,  as well as rebel leaders, sports stars, Grammy award winning artists and indicted war criminals. The CBC closed the Africa bureau in April 2012 after the federal government chopped $115 million from its Parliamentary grant. 

McGuffin previously served as the bureau chief in Moscow for Feature Story News, a British broadcast news agency, during the last tumultuous years of the Yeltsin era.  His reports from the former Soviet Union aired on National Public Radio, CBC News, ABC Radio News and US Public Television. In 2000, he opened FSN's  Beijing bureau, before joining CTV News as its Beijing bureau chief and Asia correspondent. During a two-year stint in Rome, he also reported for ABC News and NBC News, on Vatican and European affairs. His reports aired on NBC Nightly News, MSNBC and ABC Radio.  His first job in journalism was for the MacNeil–Lehrer Newshour on PBS. He was part of the team that launched the NewsHour's award-winning website and he oversaw the NewsHour's digital foreign coverage. He graduated from Trent University, the journalism program at the University of King's College and Lisgar Collegiate Institute.

Notes

External links
 CBC News biography

Canadian television reporters and correspondents
Trent University alumni
University of King's College alumni
Year of birth missing (living people)
Living people
Lisgar Collegiate Institute alumni